Ray Anderson (born August 31, 1944, in Anniston, Alabama) was a boxer in the light heavyweight division who fought from 1965 to 1977. Anderson became the first challenger to last fifteen rounds against Bob Foster for the world Light Heavyweight title, but he lost what was his only world title try by decision.  Anderson currently lives in Anniston.

Professional career
Anderson began his rise to prominence in 1966. As a light heavyweight he took on and beat a formidable heavyweight journeyman named Amos Johnson in a ten-rounder at The Akron Armory in Akron, Ohio. As an amateur, Anderson was one of the few men to beat the young Cassius Clay (known later as Muhammad Ali) who went on to become the Heavyweight Champion of the world. Ray's career continued as he fought Joe Byrd of Flint, Michigan, in 1969, knocking Joe out in round 1. Ray also knocked out Canton's Marion Conner in Round 2, sealing his stature as Ohio's best light heavyweight. He fought John Griffin of Syracuse, New York twice, losing both in close decisions.

Ray Anderson was credited by Joe Frazier, who long used him as a sparring partner because of his tall rangy Ali-like style as assisting him in his preparation to unify the heavyweight title in 1970, with his win over WBA heavyweight titleholder Jimmy Ellis at Madison Square Garden. Later in 1970, Anderson was to bite off more than he could chew when he decided to fight a young prospect at the Cleveland Arena in Cleveland, Ohio named Ted Gullick, after providing Gullick with a boxing lesson in rounds 1 through 4, toward the end of the fourth Gullick scored a knockdown with a sharp left hook. Anderson rose and was in part saved by the bell. Later Gullick dominated the fight and finished Anderson in the 9th round by knocking him out.  Anderson beat Gregorio Peralta by a ten-round decision in Spain in 1972.

The pinnacle of Ray's career was his challenge to the former Light Heavyweight Champion of the World Bob Foster. Anderson was a tall light-heavyweight of his era, standing 6 feet 1 inch. However, Foster was 6 feet 3 inches and could punch very hard. Anderson was not used to giving away height; he prided himself in being both handsome and fast. He was not willing to risk being hit by Foster, thus he chose to dance and defend for most of the fight, thus losing a fifteen-round decision. To Anderson's credit he was one of the few men that would last all 15 rounds with Foster. The late Yank Durham, Joe Frazier's trainer, worked Anderson's corner during the Foster fight felt that Anderson should have eliminated the Ali style tactics and take it to Foster and was upset by the outcome. Anderson had proven to be a very respected fighter early on and once joining promoter Don King, seemed to start an altered course in his career which can't be explained. It is thought that King wanted to use Anderson to promote other upcoming boxers in order to propel himself into the limelight instead of using Anderson's talent to help him reach the top of the rankings. Anderson's children Deric and Eric (twins), and Brigitte Anderson were last known to reside in Ohio. In the early 90's one (or both) of Anderson's twin sons; were known for his athletic abilities and had shown glimpses of skills that would advance him into professional football. However, details of his efforts are not recorded.

Professional boxing record

Exhibition boxing record

References

External links
 

1944 births
Living people
Boxers from Alabama
Sportspeople from Anniston, Alabama
Light-heavyweight boxers
American male boxers
African-American boxers
21st-century African-American people
20th-century African-American sportspeople